George Kinloch may refer to:

George Kinloch (politician) (1775–1833), Scottish reformer and politician
George Ritchie Kinloch (1796–1877), Scottish lawyer, antiquarian and ballad collector